The Benson Tower is a residential high-rise building located in downtown Portland, Oregon, United States.

It was named after the historic timber baron Simon Benson, as the tower was built on the site of his original residence. The Benson Tower has 26 floors and features 58 single bedroom condominiums, 92 two bedroom condominiums and 6 penthouses. Designed in the modern Vancouver, B.C. point tower style by Hancock Brucker, now IBI Group of Vancouver, B.C. and constructed by ITC Construction Group of Vancouver, B.C. The project attracted controversy from the local and international trade unions as it was built using open shop practices. ITC Construction Group is large general contractor with over 120 highrise towers to its credit in Western Canada and the Northwest USA.

See also
List of tallest buildings in Portland, Oregon

References

External links
 
Benson Tower official site

2007 establishments in Oregon
Residential buildings completed in 2007
Residential skyscrapers in Portland, Oregon